Wong & Winchester is a Canadian television drama series,  which premiered on January 17, 2023, on Citytv.

Premise
The series centers on Marissa Wong (Grace Lynn Kung) and Sarah Winchester (Sofia Banzhaf), an ex-cop and a naive former university student who partner as private investigators in Montreal.

Cast
 Grace Lynn Kung as Marissa Wong
 Sofia Banzhaf as Sarah Winchester
 Joe Cobden as Garry
 Anthony Lemke as Martin Simard

Episodes

Production

Filming 
The series is produced by Pixcom, and shot in Montreal, Quebec.

References

2020s Canadian drama television series
Citytv original programming
Television shows filmed in Montreal
2023 Canadian television series debuts